The 1908 NYU Violets football team was an American football team that represented New York University as an independent during the 1908 college football season. In their second year under head coach Herman Olcott, the team compiled a 2–3–2 record.

Schedule

Regular season

Scrimmage games

References

NYU
NYU Violets football seasons
NYU Violets football